Emanuel Sebastian Snyder  (born Emanuel Sebastian Schneider) (December 12, 1854 – November 24, 1932) was a Major League Baseball player. He played for the  1876 Cincinnati Reds and 1884 Wilmington Quicksteps.

External links

Major League Baseball outfielders
Cincinnati Reds (1876–1879) players
Wilmington Quicksteps players
Baseball players from Camden, New Jersey
1854 births
1932 deaths
Springfield Champion City players
Wilmington Quicksteps (minor league) players
19th-century baseball players